Grzegorz Strauchold (born 1958) is a Polish historian, specializing in the history of the 20th century.

Biography 
He is a graduate and research fellow of the Institute of History, University of Wrocław. Doctoral degree in humanities in the history obtained in 1993 on the basis of work: Poland indigenous population of the western and northern regions. Study journalism years 1944-1948 under prof. Wojciech Wrzesiński. Received a postdoctoral degree on the work of Western thought and its implementation in People's Poland in the years 1945-1957.Deals with the historical geography, history: political thought, the most recent, Western and Northern Territories in Poland after 1945. Head of the Department of Contemporary History of the Historical Institute of the University of Wrocław. In the period 2005-2008 Deputy Director of the Institute for the teaching of studies of stationary.

Selected publications 
 Poland native population of the western and northern regions: the views of not only public years 1944-1948, Olsztyn 1995
 Indigenous Peoples, Polish, German, or ... : From nationalism to communism (1945–1949), Toruń 2001
 Western thought and its implementation in People's Poland in the years 1945-1957, Toruń 2003
 Wrocław - Polish capital on an occasional basis: around a post-war celebration of anniversaries of historic, Wrocław 2003
 Dolnoślązacy? : Shaping the identity of the inhabitants of Lower Silesia after World War II, Wrocław 2007. With: Joanna Nowosielska-Sobel.
 Piastowsko-Communist satisfaction?, Wrocław 2008. With: Joanna Nowosielska-Sobel.

Footnotes 

1958 births
20th-century Polish historians
Polish male non-fiction writers
Living people
21st-century Polish historians